Weapon Plus is a fictional clandestine program appearing in American comic books published by Marvel Comics. It was created by Grant Morrison during their run in New X-Men. The program's purpose is the creation of super-soldiers intended to fight the wars of the future, especially a mutant-human war. Weapon X, the organization's most well-known program, was originally the tenth installation, but eventually it branched off and became an independent program with similar purposes. Morrison's introduction of Weapon Plus also shed new information about the origins of Weapon X, Captain America and other Marvel Comics supersoldiers.

Fictional team history
During the 1940s the existence of mutants was not yet known to the general public. A few individuals were aware of the coming of Homo superior and the fact that they had the potential to replace baseline humans as the dominant species of Earth. Thus Weapon Plus was created to address the so-called mutant problem. What was unknown by everyone involved in Weapon Plus is that its mastermind, John Sublime, was actually the host body for a sentient bacteria present in every living creature on the planet, save for mutants, who were genetically immune to the Sublime infection.

The first nine instalments of Weapon Plus were partially successful. Weapon X produced a number of agents, though it branched off and even became opposed to Weapon Plus's interests. To prevent subsidiary programs from going rogue, Weapon Plus directly oversaw the creation of the last living weapons operating in the clandestine facilities of The World, employing Bolivar Trask's Sentinel technology.

Throughout the decades, Weapon Plus has used increasingly more extreme methods to create its super-soldiers. Captain America was enhanced to peak human levels. Weapon X employed genetic alteration, brainwashing and memory implants. The latest creations were bred specifically to become mutant-hunting weapons much deadlier than Sentinels.

Following M-Day, most of mutantkind has been rendered powerless, and mutants as a race are on the brink of extinction. Weapon Plus appears again as Sublime attempts to use the Stepford Cuckoos to wipe out the surviving mutants.

Programs

Weapon 0
Project: Rebirth began as a collaboration between the American, British and German eugenicists led by Doctors Reinstein and Koch. When World War II began, Koch took over the German program, and Josef Reinstein (Erskine) moved to the American program.

John Steele, also known as American Soldier, was a Super-Soldier of unknown origin who fought in World War I. His body was kept in stasis by Nazi scientists, including Abraham Erskine, who sought to replicate his abilities as part of Project: Nietzche, but with little success.

Weapon I
Project: Rebirth, headed by Professor Abraham Erskine (given the alias Josef Reinstein as a cover identity) managed to produce Captain America (Steve Rogers). However, Erskine was murdered moments after Rogers was successfully empowered. The refinements he introduced which made the process successful were lost with his death. With his demise, Koch took over the American program.

Two other subjects, Clinton McIntyre, a.k.a. Protocide, a failed experiment who was placed in suspended animation and was revived in the modern era by AIM, and the first mutant experiment designated Queen seem to have occurred prior to the Super Soldier Serum being tested on Steve Rogers.

Early attempts to recreate the formula resulted in African American super soldiers (most prominently Isaiah Bradley). Three hundred African-American soldiers were taken from Camp Cathcart and subjected to potentially fatal experiments at an undisclosed location, as seen in Truth: Red, White & Black in an attempt to recreate the Super Soldier formula. Only five men survived the original trials; hundreds of test subjects left behind at Camp Cathcart and the camp's commander were executed by US soldiers in the name of secrecy, the families of the three hundred were told that they had died in battle. Isaiah Bradley was the lone survivor.

Although there were many later attempts to recreate or reverse-engineer Project: Rebirth's Super-Soldier Serum, none are known to have been involved with Weapon Plus except for the attempt that resulted in the creation of Isaiah Bradley's son Josiah X. Weapon Plus considers Captain America as its most successful creation, despite the fact that Rogers has been at odds with the United States government a number of times. Project: Rebirth was retroactively made a part of the Weapon Plus after WWII when Weapon Plus was actually formed.

Weapon II
Weapon II experimented on animals. It was implied by Grant Morrison that these animal weapons were the animal cyborgs in the comic We3, not published by Marvel.

Weapon II was later captured as part of a group of semi-animal characters including Howard the Duck, Squirrel Girl, Beast, and Rocket Raccoon. He appeared as a squirrel with Wolverine's "Adamantium skeleton, claws, intelligence, and healing factor" (though his claws make a "SNUKT" sound compared to Wolverine's "SNIKT"). Weapon II also sports a visor and many of Wolverine's mannerisms.

In Wolverine and Captain America Weapon Plus #1 (July 2019), it is implied that the team Brute Force, made of animal cyborg hybrids, was part of the Weapon II program.

Weapon III
Like Weapons II and IV, Weapon III was originally said to be experiments on animals, however, this was later retconned.

Weapon III (Harry Pizer) was a mutant with elastic multi-sensory skin. Originally a barrister, he was recruited by the Weapon Plus program to help protect his nation from the approaching Cold War. His skin's durability and elasticity was enhanced. He originally worked in espionage, gathering intelligence from the Soviets.

He was eventually sent to Otherworld in order to retrieve the Orb of Necromancy. However he was stopped by Fantomex and, for the many deaths he caused, subsequently punished by the Captain Britain Corps and flayed alive, his skin machined off and used to form sentient bullets, some of which came to be possessed by Genoshan soldiers. He survived, however, and taught his muscles to function in a similar manner to his former mutant skin.

He later worked with Black Air and the Brotherhood of Mutants and was known as the Skinless Man. He developed a hatred of Fantomex, who he blamed for his current state. He later murdered Fantomex by ripping out his heart. He was later killed in retaliation by Deadpool.

Weapons IV
Weapons IV, was said to be employed on various criminals that were ethnic minorities as test subjects. However, Weapon IV is actually 'Project Sulfur' - the project spearheaded by Ted Sallis, whose research led him to become the Man-Thing.

Weapon V
Weapon V was originally believed to have been performed on ethnic people, but then during the Vietnam War, then S.H.I.E.L.D sponsored program under the pseudonym of Sym-soldier used pieces of the ancient symbiote named Grendel and bonded them to various able bodied operatives in order to fight in the conflict. However, the program was shut down after said enhanced specimens were driven mad by their second skins, having later been captured by Nick Fury and Logan.
When the government got hold of the Venom symbiote, they decided to use it as part of Weapon V under the name of Project Rebirth 2.0 to create a new soldier with symbiote augmentation. They bonded the suit to former veteran Flash Thompson which resulted in the creation of Agent Venom. 

Project Rebirth 2.0 is later shut down by Captain America. 

The project would resume behind closed doors under the Weapon + director William Junger's supervision. Supplanting volunteers from a mercenary unit hailing out of Eaglestar International as waiting test subjects for virochemically neutered symbiote samples. The Klyntar used would purposely have their hive link severed so that the presence behind their proginator wouldn't irrevocably madden its hosts. But it was again put on ice when the demiurgically anointed Dark Carnage went on a killing spree, collecting & harvesting Klyntar derived codex samples from the project, Mars Team and its supervisor Dr. Breen. Whom offered himself and what remains of the symbiote clad armorines in willing sacrifice to Knull's chosen after being corrupted by the Grendel samples he'd used on himself.

Weapon VI
Weapon VI was led by Dr. Noah Burstein and was responsible for giving Luke Cage his powers.

Weapon VII
Weapon VII, a.k.a. Project: Homegrown, experimented on human soldiers during the Vietnam War. Some of the known participants who died in Project: Homegrown included Andrew Perlmutter, Michael Labash, John Walsh, James MacPherson and fourteen other unknown recruits. The only known successful subject of Project: Homegrown was Nuke, who had armored implants under his epidermis and was addicted to powerful narcotics. Logan, who would later become one of Weapon Plus' victims, kidnapped Nuke as a child, and oversaw his conditioning.

Weapon VII also experimented with adamantium bonding, which helped create Cyber.

The United Kingdom also had its own version of Project: Homegrown, a.k.a. the Black Budget, which managed to create the team known as the Super Soldiers: Dauntless, Gog, Dreadnaught, Revenge, Victory, Invincible, Challenger, and some unnamed super-soldiers.

The Mercy Corporation, an offshoot of S.H.I.E.L.D. that worked on super-soldiers and eventually broke off, also had its own unit of super-soldiers, using a serum similar to previous derivatives of the Super-Soldier Serum from Weapon I. Their agents included Jack Reno, Keel, Kyle, Agent Villarosa, Agent Davis and Agent Milo.

Weapon VIII
Weapons VIII experimented on criminals and psychopaths.

Weapon IX
Weapon IX (according to artist Rob Liefeld) was originally supposed to be Wade Wilson, a.k.a. Deadpool. Weapon IX is later revealed to be project 'Psyche', none other than Typhoid Mary.

Weapon X

The Weapon X Program experimented on mutants, most notably Wolverine. Later, however, the Weapon X Program branched off into other fields, employing and/or experimenting on a number of test subjects such as Sabretooth. Eventually the program was shut down and became a part of the Canadian government known as Department K. Deadpool, who was a Weapon X reject, was created by Department K. The Facility, a civilian project with connections to the military Weapon X program, would eventually create X-23, a female clone of Wolverine created using genetic material salvaged from the original project.

Weapon XI
No character under the official title of Weapon XI has been revealed. However; according to artist Rob Liefeld, Weapon XI was originally intended to be Garrison Kane, who went on to be better known as simply Kane, or confusingly Weapon X.

Weapon XII
Weapon Plus created Weapon XII (a.k.a. Huntsman, real name Zona Cluster 6) at the England-based facilities of The World. He was the first living weapon created employing artificial evolution and nanosentinel technology. Weapon XII was "accidentally" unleashed on the Channel Tunnel and fought X-Corporation members Cannonball, M, Darkstar, Rictor, Siryn and Multiple Man. Weapon XII was eliminated by Fantomex with the aid of Jean Grey and Professor X, but at the cost of Darkstar's life. Huntsman was created to be part of the Super-Sentinels, a mutant-hunting team of superheroes with a base in a Weapon Plus space station. This team, a brainchild of John Sublime, was intended to be a publicity stunt to make the genocide of mutants much more acceptable to the public.

Weapon XIII
Weapon Plus created Weapon XIII, also known as Fantomex, at The World. However, Fantomex rebelled against his creators. As in the case of Weapon XII, Fantomex's powers derive from Nanosentinel technology.

Weapon XIV
In New X-Men #154 (May 2004), Grant Morrison's last issue of New X-Men, the telepathic quintuplets called the Stepford Cuckoos were identified as Weapon XIV.
The Stepford Cuckoos' link to Weapon Plus has finally been addressed in the Phoenix: Warsong miniseries, written by Greg Pak, which explores unresolved storylines from Morrison's New X-Men and Pak's Phoenix: Endsong.

Weapon XV
Weapon XV, a.k.a. Ultimaton, was designed to be the Super-Sentinels' grand powerhouse. He was killed after Wolverine destroyed the Weapon Plus space station that was designed as the Super-Sentinels HQ.

Ultimaton was recently resurrected in The World and tasked by Fantomex with guarding a hidden chamber which held a child Apocalypse clone created from a blood sample taken from the one previously executed on the Celestial Ship.

Weapon XVI
Weapon XVI, a.k.a. Allgod, is a "living religion", a virus that "attacks the faith reserves". People infected by Allgod worship the World, and become fanatically devoted slaves to it. Wolverine, Fantomex, and Noh-Varr team up to shut down the World (which has now become sentient), its weapons production, and Allgod along with it.

Weapon Infinity
Weapon Infinity, also known as Project: Deathlok, is the cyborg conversion of both ordinary citizens and then all superheroes in the future. The first steps were the reanimation of military corpses, then the wholesale conversion of dead bodies into "Deathloks", modelled after the hero of the same name. The Deathloks were then used to hunt down and convert all heroes of the future. Project: Deathlok was first seen in Dark Reign: The List: Wolverine, and later fleshed out in the final arc of Wolverine: Weapon X. Uncanny X-Force has since elaborated on the project, revealing it to be Weapon Infinity during the 'Deathlok Nation' arc.

Weapon Minus 
A number of scientists were funded by S.H.I.E.L.D to counteract the Weapon Plus program in case it went rogue. In what was explicitly labelled the Weapon Minus program, one of these scientists, when his branch of the project had his funding and materials cut, was forced to test the resultant mixture of Super-Soldier Serum and LSD on himself, the result was named Doctor Mindbubble, who had the psychic ability to create miniature mind-universes that could trap almost anyone. He was intended to counter Weapon VII.

American Kaiju
This program used already existing substances in order to create a new super-soldier. They used the Gamma radiation, Beast's Mutant Growth Hormone, Pym Particles and the Lizard formula which resulted in Todd Ziller becoming a monster similar to Godzilla.

The World
The World is a secret lab owned by the Weapon Plus Project, in which the program scientists intend to create superior humans employing eugenics, nanotechnology and artificial evolution technology (time is "artificial" at the World and it can be frozen or altered in any way the Program Scientists desire). The artificial time technology employed by Weapon Plus was stolen from AIM. A low level of gamma radiation is constantly present to produce mutations in the population.

The human DNA of the inhabitants' ancestors in this artificial environment was spliced with sentinel microtechnology, meaning they are no longer humans in the traditional meaning of the word, as they have evolved into a race of mutated and naturally born cyborgs refined through eugenics.

Because the scientists have absolute control over the time inside The World (according to Fantomex the time is "liquid"), both freezing it and speeding it up so that decades and centuries can pass within it while time runs normally in the real world, this opens up for new possibilities within the areas of eugenics and genetic engineering. The most promising individuals in each generation are selected while the others are terminated. Also natural selection in the form of the survival of the fittest is possible by exposing the population to different forms of selective pressure. This way, new breeds of superhumans can be evolved within a few months, instead of hundreds or thousands of years. Half a million years inside The World represents only eighteen months on the outside.

The World's facilities contains a population (with its own religion, history and culture) that is led to believe that beyond the World's limits there's nothing, other than endless rock and mutants who are coming to destroy them. Those who are selected for termination believe there is a reward awaiting them at the other side. The World is also filled with numerous experiments and prototypes of Weapon Plus, such as techno-organic human-animal car-cops.

The World was partially destroyed when agents of AIM attacked the facilities in order to recover the technology Weapon Plus stole from them. They are soon killed by Weapon XV.

After years of being uninhabited the World itself, still operational though abandoned, has itself became sentient, and is continuing to make super advanced Weapons. Wolverine and Noh-Varr head to the World to try and stop Norman Osborn from claiming it and its creations as part of H.A.M.M.E.R. While there they are attacked by a large army of mutant zombies, soon revealed to be infected by Weapon XVI, "Allgod". Noh-Varr is rescued by Fantomex, who is there to retrieve the World's brain to help reprogram it into becoming a more benevolent and peaceful being. The two make their way to the World's brain, where they are confronted by the Allgod zombies, which now include Wolverine. Noh-Varr is able to disarm Allgod by kissing the World's brain, showing it some compassion. Immediately after this, Osborn's agent, a remote controlled robot zombie, plunges its fist into the World's brain, removing part of the brain, only for Wolverine to slice the robot zombie's arm off. Fantomex then uses a shrink-ray he stole from Doctor Doom to shrink the brain, and he takes the brain for his own currently unrevealed purposes.

In other media

Film
 In the films X-Men and X2, flashbacks show Wolverine has participated in the Weapon X program run by William Stryker, but has no memory of it. The Weapon X facility is revealed to be in Alkali Lake, Alberta. It is destroyed when the dam fails. Jean Grey holds back the water allowing the X-Men to escape, but is killed in the process.  In X-Men: The Last Stand, Alkali is revisited by Scott Summers who is telekinetically drawn to Alkali.  He sees the reborn Jean who inadvertently kills him. Logan and Storm are sent to Alkali Lake to investigate, where they find Jean as Phoenix.
 In the 2008 Marvel Cinematic Universe (MCU) film The Incredible Hulk, General Ross can be seen extracting an experimental super-soldier serum created by Dr. Reinstein from a cold storage lab where the containers are marked "Weapons Plus".
 After the success of the three X-Men films, the studio produced a spin-off film X-Men Origins: Wolverine. This film explains and expands on the origins of Logan, including his time at the Weapon X facility. It explains that Weapon X is the tenth weapon created by the lab. Each weapon is a living mutant enhanced by technological means. Weapon X (Wolverine) is given adamantium bones to increase his durability. Weapon XI was portrayed in the film as a genetically altered Wade Wilson played by both Scott Adkins and Ryan Reynolds. Weapon XI is also referred to by Col. William Stryker as "Deadpool", due to having powers "pooled" from many other mutants killed and/or kidnapped in the film, including Wolverine's healing factor, Cyclops' optic blasts, Wraith's teleportation ability, and Chris Bradley's technopathy. He also has retractable blades extending from his arms. Weapon XI is the final antagonist of the film, having been genetically altered to be the ultimate mutant killer. His head is cut off by Wolverine while his back is turned battling Sabretooth. In a post-credits scene, his body looks for and finds his head in the rubble, which returns to life.
 Project Rebirth (Weapon I) appears in the 2011 Marvel Cinematic Universe film Captain America: The First Avenger. Rebirth is a Strategic Scientific Reserve project to create a new line of Super Soldiers for its World War II effort against the Red Skull and his division. It began with a collaboration between U.S., British and German scientists led by Dr. Abraham Erskine and under the supervision of Peggy Carter, Howard Stark and Chester Phillips.
 Alkali Lake is featured again in X-Men: Apocalypse, run again by Stryker. In 1983, he captured members of the X-Men, because they were suspects behind sudden nuclear launches into space by the ancient mutant Apocalypse. However, Jean, Scott and Kurt, who infiltrated the base, released an imprisoned Weapon X upon the base, and he tore through the base's security and escaped. The X-Men were freed by Scott and used a jet in the hangar to escape, while later he was mugged by Essex Corporation to reclaim what was left of the Weapon X Program.

Novels
 In the non-canonical novel Wolverine: Violent Tendencies, Weapon 0 is referred to as "Weapon Null", and is an early and dismissed branch of a super-soldier program completely different from the Weapon Plus program of the comics. Weapon Null was focused on the utilisation of bio-enhancement to upgrade soldiers into organic self-contained weapons; the grotesque creations require extensive and expensive maintenance and transportation conditions, so the program was shelved. During the course of the novel, Wolverine encounters four of Weapon Null's more successful creations: "Slammer", "Blowtorch", "Cypher" and "Bipolar".

Collected Editions

References

External links
 Weapon Plus at Marvel.com
 Weapon Plus at Marvel Wiki
 weaponx.net.ru Alkali Lake

Marvel Comics supervillain teams